The 1999 Bournemouth International was a men's tennis tournament that took place between the 13 and 19 September 1999, on clay in Bournemouth.  It was an International Series event which was part of the 1999 ATP Tour. Félix Mantilla was the defending champion but he lost in the first round to Kenneth Carlsen.  Adrian Voinea defeated Stefan Koubek in the final.

Finals

Singles

 Adrian Voinea defeated  Stefan Koubek 1–6, 7–5, 7–6(7–2)

Doubles

 David Adams /  Jeff Tarango def.  Michael Kohlmann / 
Nicklas Kulti 6–3, 6–7(5–7), 7–6(7–5)

Clay court tennis tournaments
Bournemouth International
Sport in Bournemouth
Brighton International
Bright